is a junction passenger railway station located in the city of Hachiōji, Tokyo, Japan , operated by the private railway operator Keio Corporation.

Lines 
Kitano Station is a junction of the Keiō and Takao Lines. It is and is located 36.1 kilometers from the starting point of the Keio Line at Shinjuku Station and is a terminus of the Takao Line.

Services
All seven types of train service stop at this station: local, rapid, semi express, express, semi special express, special express trains and Keiō Liner trains.

Trains run 0445-0050 weekdays and 0450-0045 weekends. The typical hourly weekday off-peak service is:
9 trains to Shinjuku, of which:
3 are Special Express (Takahatafudō, Seiseki-sakuragaoka, Bubaigawara, Fuchū, Chōfu, Meidaimae and Shinjuku)
3 are Semi-Special Express (Takahatafudō, Seiseki-sakuragaoka, Bubaigawara, Fuchū, Chōfu, Chitose-Karasuyama, Meidaimae, Sasazuka and Shinjuku)
3 are Local
6 trains to Keiō-hachiōji
6 trains to Takaosanguchi, of which:
3 are Special Express (Mejirodai, Takao, Takaosanguchi)
3 are Local

The typical hourly weekend off-peak service is:
12 trains to Shinjuku, of which:
3 are Special Express from Keiō-hachiōji
3 are Semi-Special Express from Takaosanguchi
6 are Local
6 trains to Keiō-hachiōji
6 Local trains to Takaosanguchi

Station layout

The station has two elevated island platforms serving four tracks. Tracks 1 and 2 serve Keiō Line trains bound for Keiō-hachiōji Station and Takao Line trains bound for Takaosanguchi Station. Tracks 3 and 4 serve trains bound for Shinjuku Station.

Platforms

History
The station opened on March 24, 1925 as a stop on the Gyokunan Electric Railway, which was absorbed into the Keio Electric Tramway on December 1, 1926. The Goryō Line opened to Tama-Goryō-mae on March 20, 1931 but was suspended on January 21, 1945. After the war, on October 1, 1967, Keio Teito Electric Railway opened the Takao Line to Takaosanguchi, part of which used the old Goryō Line. The station was elevated in the early 1990s. Semi Special Express services began calling here following their creation on March 27, 2001.

Passenger statistics
In fiscal 2019, the station was used by an average of 23,006 passengers daily. 

The passenger figures (boarding passengers only) for previous years are as shown below.

Surrounding area
 Hachiōji city hall Kitano branch office

See also
List of railway stations in Japan

References

External links

 Kitano Station information 

Keio Line
Stations of Keio Corporation
Railway stations in Tokyo
Railway stations in Japan opened in 1925
Hachiōji, Tokyo